John Joseph Symond   (born 17 August 1947) is an Australian entrepreneur, former financial executive, and the founder of Aussie Home Loans.

Early life
Symond was born on 17 August 1947 in Crookwell, New South Wales and raised in Sydney. He spent most of his time between Brisbane, where his mother's family lived, and Sydney, near his father's relatives. He was one of seven children and the son of Lebanese immigrant fruit shop owners, and regularly helped at his parents shop before and after school.

He attended eleven different schools, including St Patrick's College, Strathfield, St Laurence's College, South Brisbane and Homebush Boys High School where he matriculated in 1965. After leaving school, Symond studied law and joined a firm in Bankstown where he learned conveyancing and specialized in property and finance.

Career 
By the late 1980s, he had created a boutique financial services company, Mortgage Acceptance Corporation (MAC), that specialised in finding and providing commercial and investment loans to investors. One of Australia's first mortgage brokers, he eventually undertook a joint venture with Beneficial Finance, a subsidiary of State Bank of South Australia. When State Bank of South Australia went broke in the 1980s, he came within a whisker of bankruptcy, and it was this negative experience with a bank that formed the basis of the Aussie philosophy – offering better deals and better customer service to everyday Australians.

Aussie Home Loans 
Supported by a $10,000 loan from his older brother Michael, Symond founded Aussie Home Loans in February 1992 and was able to fulfil his ambition. With his nephew, James by his side, Symond was widely credited with bringing competition to the Australian home lending industry and was the first major disruptor to the banks oligopoly of the Australian home loan market. The company was unique in its approach to home loans, offering 24 hours a day service and loans far cheaper than those offered by banks. In 1994 Aussie introduced securitisation to its home loans, allowing it to offer loans upwards of 3% cheaper than its competitors. In 2002, Aussie Home Loans diversified to become a mortgage broker – offering bank and non-bank products.

The company rapidly grew as consumers became aware of its products and that of other non-banks and the competition heated up. In August 2008 the Commonwealth Bank acquired a 33% stake in Aussie. Aussie acquired Wizard Home Loans in February 2009 and National Mortgage Brokers (nMB) in 2012. The Commonwealth Bank increased its investment in Aussie from 33 per cent to 80 per cent in May 2013, then to 100 per cent in August 2017. Symond was the Chairman of Aussie from 2017 until November 2020; while his nephew, James Symond, continues to serve as the chief executive officer.

Personal life

Symond has two children, Stephen and Deborah. He has been involved with numerous organisations such as Jeans for Genes and is a former chairman of the Sydney Opera House Trust.

Symond has been married to Amber McDonald since February 2016.

He has a substantial collection of Australian art deco and contemporary art including works of Brett Whiteley and Sidney Nolan. In 2017 he took delivery of a  Dutch built Feadship named Hasna, believed to have cost more than $100 million.

Symond built a palatial home called Wingadal in the Sydney suburb of Point Piper that is now estimated to be worth over $100 million. He put it on the market in 2016 but withdrew it two months later in 2017.

Net worth 
, Symond's net worth was assessed as 800 million, as published in The Australian Financial Review 2021 Rich List.

Awards
Symond was appointed a Member of the Order of Australia in 2002 for service to the mortgage industry in Australia, particularly the home finance sector, and to the community. In 2004, he was inducted into the Australian Banking and Finance Magazine's Hall of Fame in May 2004 – the first non-banker to be admitted.

In August 2011, he was listed eighth in a poll by The Australian Financial Review of the most influential business, economic and political leaders of the past 60 years. In August 2012, he was named Australian Father of the Year. In July 2013 he was honoured with the 2013 Gold Harold Humanitarian Award, at the sixth annual Gold Harold Awards, for his ongoing philanthropic interest in children's causes and charities.

References

External links
Case Study on John Symond
Interview on ABC

"inform ARTICLE" on John Symond

Australian people of Lebanese descent
Businesspeople from Sydney
1947 births
Living people
Members of the Order of Australia
Australian company founders